StoneWall Noise Orchestra is a Swedish rock band formed in Borlänge in 2004 by members of the defunct Demon Cleaner, Snicken and Jansson, with Singe (guest vocalist in Greenleaf) and former Unhuman Fear drummer Mr. Pillow and bass player Jonas. In 2005 they released their first album Vol. 1 on Daredevil Records and in 2008 rereleased it with bonus tracks. In 2006 John Hermansen replaced Singe as the singer. After the recording of their second album Hermansen left the band and Singe returned. In 2008 they released their second album Constants In An Ever Changing Universe on M2 Recordings which received a KKKK rating from Kerrang! and 8/10 from Metal Hammer.

They have been described as being old Black Sabbath meets Monster Magnet. They have toured in Germany and Belgium.

Discography
 Vol. 1 (2005) - Daredevil Records
 Constants In An Ever Changing Universe (2008) - M2 Recordings
 Sweet Mississippi Deal (2010) - Transubstans
 Salvation (2013) - Transubstans Records
 The Machine, The Devil & The Dope (2016) - Steamhammer
 Deathtripper (2020) -  Transubstans Records

References

External links
ninehertz Stonewall Noise Orchestra. Vol. 1
Monolith Review of StoneWall Noise Orchestra - "Vol. 1"
Monolith Review of StoneWall Noise Orchestra - "6 songs Promo"
review in Stalker Magazine
Metal Mayhem UK Stonewall Noise Orchestra - Constants In An Ever Changing Universe
Perkele Interview in Italian

Swedish musical groups